Operation Klipklop occurred during the South African Border War between the Republic of South Africa and SWAPO. The operation began at first light on the 30 July 1980 when South African forces attacked SWAPO facilities in Angola. The objective was a PLAN logistics base at the town of Chitado, 5 km from the Namibian border and 35 km east of Ruacana, with the aim of disrupting mortar attacks on the Ruacana hydro-electric scheme.

Supported by Alouette III attack helicopters, 80 men were dropped by helicopters close to the town. Twenty seven defenders, possibly PLAN or MPLA soldiers, died in the attack that followed with the SADF destroying the MPLA base in the town on their withdrawal. This operation followed Operation Sceptic and preceded Operation Protea.

Footnotes

External links 
 

1980 in South Africa
1980 in South West Africa
Battles and operations of the South African Border War
Cross-border operations of South Africa
July 1980 events in Africa